Kosmos 453 ( meaning Cosmos 453), known before launch as DS-P1-Yu No.44, was a Soviet satellite which was launched in 1971 as part of the Dnepropetrovsk Sputnik programme. It was a  spacecraft, which was built by the Yuzhnoye Design Bureau, and was used as a radar calibration target for anti-ballistic missile tests.

Launch 
Kosmos 453 was successfully launched into low Earth orbit on 19 October 1971, with the rocket lifting off at 12:40:01 UTC. The launch took place from Site 133/1 at the Plesetsk Cosmodrome, and used a Kosmos-2I 63SM carrier rocket.

Orbit 
Upon reaching orbit, it was assigned its Kosmos designation, and received the International Designator 1971-090A.

Kosmos 453 was the forty-sixth of seventy nine DS-P1-Yu satellites to be launched, and the forty-first of seventy two to successfully reach orbit. It remained in orbit until it decayed and reentered the atmosphere on 19 March 1972.

See also

 1971 in spaceflight

References

1971 in spaceflight
Kosmos satellites
Spacecraft launched in 1971
Dnepropetrovsk Sputnik program